Henry Paul Samuell (October 2, 1886 – March 21, 1938) was an American jurist and lawyer.

Born on a farm near Havana, Illinois, in Mason County, Illinois, Samuell went to Illinois College and then received his degree from Illinois Wesleyan University in 1910. Samuell was admitted to the Illinois and Montana bars. Samuell practiced law in Montana for three years before returning to Jacksonville, Illinois where he practiced law. In 1916, Samuell served as county judge. In 1929, Samuell was appointed to the Illinois Supreme Court and was defeated for election in 1930. Samuell was a Republican. Samuell died at his home in Jacksonville, Illinois.

Notes

External links
Data base-Henry Paul Samuell

1886 births
1938 deaths
Politicians from Jacksonville, Illinois
People from Havana, Illinois
Illinois College alumni
Illinois Wesleyan University alumni
Illinois lawyers
Montana lawyers
Illinois Republicans
Illinois state court judges
Justices of the Illinois Supreme Court
20th-century American judges
20th-century American lawyers